Chengnan (usually a romanisation of ) may refer to:
Chengnan, Shaoyang, subdistrict of Daxiang District, Shaoyang City, Hunan, China
Chengnan Subdistrict, Shigatse, Tibet Autonomous Region, China
Chengnan Subdistrict, Chongqing, subdistrict of Qianjiang District, Chongqing, China
Chengnan Subdistrict Shantou, subdistrict of Chaoyang District, Shantou, Guangdong, China
The southern area of the walled city of Nanjing